Jeramie is a given name. Notable people with the name include:

Jeramie Kling (born 1982), American drummer, audio engineer
Jeramie Rain (born 1948), American actress
Jeramie Richardson (born 1983), American football player

See also
Jerami, given name
Jeremie (name), given name and surname